Events from the year 1131 in Ireland.

Incumbents
High King: Tairrdelbach Ua Conchobair

Events
The Book of Glendalough was written in Glendalough